Martos is a city in Spain. Martos may also refer to
 Martos CD, a Spanish football club based in Martos
 Fuensanta de Martos, another city in Spain
 Martovce (Martos), a village in southern Slovakia
 Martos (surname)